Sergio Robles Valenzuela (born April 16, 1946) is a Mexican former catcher in Major League Baseball. He played in 16 games over three seasons (1972, 1973, 1976) for the Baltimore Orioles and Los Angeles Dodgers. He had been acquired along with Doyle Alexander, Bob O'Brien and Royle Stillman by the Orioles from the Dodgers for Frank Robinson and Pete Richert at the Winter Meetings on December 2, 1971. In his native México he is known as Kaliman.

References

External links

1946 births
Living people
Albuquerque Dukes players
Arkansas Travelers players
Bakersfield Dodgers players
Baltimore Orioles players
Baseball players from Sonora
Diablos Rojos del México players
Los Angeles Dodgers players
Major League Baseball catchers
Major League Baseball players from Mexico
Mexican Baseball Hall of Fame inductees
Mexican expatriate baseball players in the United States
Mexican League baseball managers
Minor league baseball coaches
Minor league baseball managers
Naranjeros de Hermosillo players
Nogales Yaquis players
Rieleros de Aguascalientes players
Rochester Red Wings players
Spokane Indians players
Tigres del México players
Tulsa Oilers (baseball) players
People from Magdalena de Kino